Orpheus and Eurydice is a 1975 rock opera album by Russian composer Alexander Zhurbin.

In 2003, the Opera was included in the Guinness book records as the musical, the maximum number of times played in one team (at the time of registration of the record the play was performed 2350 times).

Cast
Albert Asadullin as Orpheus
Irina Ponarovskaya as Eurydice
Bogdan Wiwczaroski as Charon

Track listing
 Prelude (1:06)
 Duet of Orpheus and Eurydice (3:01)
 Song of Orpheus (2:40)
 Chorus of Messengers (1:37)
 Farewell Scene (5:38)
 Look Back (2:08)
 Orchestral Interlude (:17)
 Introduction to Contest (1:36)
 Monologues of Singers (2:36)
 Fortune's Arioso (1:44)
 Singer's Contest (4:27)
 Orpheus Song (4:02)
 Orpheus' Glory (3:44)
 Fortune's Monologue (3:06)
 Charon's Monologue (2:58)
 Meeting Scene (3:46)
 Forgive Us, Eurydice (1:58)
 Eurydice's Song (3:24)
 Duet of Eurydice and Charon (1:24)
 Drinking Song (3:53)
 Fortune's Ballad (2:20)

References 

1975 albums
Rock operas
Rock albums by Russian artists
Orpheus
1975 musicals
Russian musicals